In Major League Baseball (MLB), a player joins a statistical club when he attains a certain milestone number in a specific statistical category.  For milestones that encompass an entire career, batters must achieve 3,000 hits or 500 home runs; pitchers must amass 300 wins or 3,000 strikeouts.  A fifth club exists for relief pitchers that have recorded 300 saves over a career.  In addition, milestones achieved in a single season include hitting 50 home runs, while three other single-season statistical clubs—the 20–20–20 club, 30–30 club and 40–40 club — include achievements from multiple statistical categories.

Reaching any one of the four career milestone clubs is often described as a guarantee of eventual entry into the Baseball Hall of Fame.

Career statistical clubs

3,000 hit club

500 home run club

300 win club

3,000 strikeout club

300 save club

Single season statistical clubs

50 home run club

Multiple statistical clubs

20–20–20 club

30–30 club

40–40 club

See also

 Baseball statistics
 Triple Crown

References

Major League Baseball statistics